Bishoftu is a town in central Ethiopia. Located in the East Shewa Zone of the Oromia Region, it sits at an elevation of 1,920 metres (6,300 ft). It was formerly known as Debre Zeyit however since the late 1990s it has been officially known by the Oromo name, Bishoftu (which translates to "sweetness" or "baked"), which was its name until 1955. The town serves as the primary airbase of the Ethiopian Air Force.

It is a resort town, known for its several lakes.

Geography 

The town is located within the Bishoftu volcanic field, an area of Holocene lava flows, cinder cones, tuff rings and maars. Several of the maars are water-filled, forming five crater lakes: Lake Bishoftu, Lake Hora (a base for watersports, many water birds and an annual festival), Lake Bishoftu Guda, Lake Koriftu and the seasonal Lake Cheleklaka. Other nearby points of interest include Mount Yerer, Green Crater Lake and Lake Hora Kiloli. Bishoftu is also home to the Ethiopian Air Force and the Harar Meda Airport (ICAO HAHM, IATA QHR), as well as a station on the Addis Ababa–Djibouti Railway.

History 
Bishoftu, as a definite entity, did not come into existence until after the Second World War. Accounts of earlier travelers call the region "Adda", although one Swedish memoir from 1935 mentions a village named "Bishoftu"; the future Cabinet minister Makonnen Habte-Wold was born in this village. The first foundation stone for the houses was laid 9 December 1937, but only 21 dwellings were ready by May 1938. Various administrative and service buildings were also built.

The history of the Ethiopian Air Force is tightly woven with the history of Bishoftu. In 1946, the beginnings of what would become the Ethiopian Air Force was moved from Lideta airport in Addis Ababa, which was needed by Ethiopian Airlines, to Bishoftu. The initial group of 19 Swedes under Count Carl Gustaf von Rosen, who were to train the pilots and support personal, arrived there after leaving Sweden between 9 January and 16 July 1946. Both Ethiopian cadets and the Swedish instructors took part in constructing the first buildings on the base. Six Saab 91 Safir training airplanes were bought in Sweden and flown to the new airbase 24 December 1946, and on 10 November 1947 a fleet of 16 Saab-built B-17s were landed at Bishoftu by Swedish pilots.

Bishoftu has had telephone service since 1954. 

Bishoftu Technical High School was established in 1958 with a 5-year course for boys 12–15 years of age. An Evangelical College had been founded two years before, which was a joint undertaking of Swedish, Norwegian, and German Evangelical missions. The Evangelical College's first headmaster was Sven Rubenson. The Animal Health Assistants Training School was established in Bishoftu in 1963, with financial support by the United Nations Special Fund.

The artist Lemma Tesefa Kesime was born (1956) in Bishoftu. He studied at the Art School 1972-1974 and received his M.A. from the Soviet Union in 1983. Returning to Ethiopia, Lemma Tesefa became a teacher at the art school in Addis Ababa. Bishoftu was also the favored weekend retreat of Emperor Haile Selassie, who built a palace in the town, named "Fairfield" after his wartime home in exile in the town of Bath, England.

Armed forces of the Ethiopian People's Revolutionary Democratic Front bypassed the capital and occupied Bishoftu in May, 1991, bringing order to the area after the collapse of the Mengistu government, taking control of what remained of the Soviet-supplied Air Force. The airbase was also used to detain several dozen senior military officers after the capture of the capital.
On 2 October 2016 at Irreechaa celebration security forces fired tear gas at protesters forcing them to panic and as a result 52 people lost their lives after falling into ditches around Lake Hora.
On 10 March 2019, Ethiopian Airlines Flight 302 crashed near the town of Bishoftu.

Demographics 
The 2007 national census reported a total population for Bishoftu of 99,928, of whom 47,860 were men and 52,068 were women. The majority of the inhabitants said they practiced Ethiopian Orthodox Christianity, with 79.75% of the population reporting they observed this belief, while 13.82% of the population were Protestant, and 4.98% of the population were Muslim.

The 1994 census reported Bishoftu had a total population of 73,372 of whom 35,058 were men and 38,314 were women. The three largest ethnic groups reported for this town were the Amhara (42.85%), the Oromo (39.40%) and the Gurage (8.30%); all other ethnic groups made up 9.44% of the population. Amharic is spoken as a first language by 71.95%, and 20.12% spoke Oromo; the remaining 7.93% spoke all other primary languages reported. Concerning religious beliefs, 87.87% of the population said they practiced Ethiopian Orthodox Christianity, 6.93% were Protestants, and 4.02% were Muslim.

Organisations
The city is home for the National Veterinary Institute of Ethiopia, established in 1963, the leading veterinary vaccine research and production center currently producing more than 20 livestock vaccines. Next door to the national veterinary institute is the school of veterinary medicine of Addis Ababa University. The Gafat Armament Engineering Complex is located here. According to the Nordic Africa Institute website, other major businesses in Bishoftu include the Ada Flour and Pasta Factory, the Pasqua Giuseppe PLC, the Salmida Leather Products Manufacturing, Ratson (Women Youth Children Development Programme), and Winrock International Ethiopia. The Bishoftu Research Center, founded in 1953, is run by the Ethiopian Institute of Agricultural Research, specializing in agricultural research, which includes acting as the national center for research to improve the yield of teff, lentils, chickpeas, and poultry. In 2007 Bishoftu became the new home of Meserete Kristos College, a Christian college owned by the Meserete Kristos Church.

Notes

External links 

 
Cities of Ethiopia: Debre Zeyit by John Taylor (Addis Tribune, 2 November 2001) (Archive)

Populated places in the Oromia Region
Resorts in Ethiopia
Volcanic crater lakes
Ethiopia
Cities and towns in Ethiopia